Ceromitia systelitis is a species of moth of the  family Adelidae. It is known from the Republic of Congo and Mozambique.

References

Adelidae
Lepidoptera of the Democratic Republic of the Congo
Lepidoptera of Mozambique
Lepidoptera of the Republic of the Congo
Moths of Sub-Saharan Africa
Moths described in 1921